Nemophora japonica is a moth of the Adelidae family or fairy longhorn moths. It was described by Stringer in 1930. It is found on the Kuriles and in Japan.

References

Adelidae
Moths described in 1930
Moths of Japan